Novokangyshevo (Yañı Käñgeş) is a rural locality (a selo) in Uchpilinsky Selsoviet, Dyurtyulinsky District, Bashkortostan, Russia. The population was 423 as of 2010. There are 6 streets.

Geography 
Novokangyshevo is located 25 km northeast of Dyurtyuli (the district's administrative centre) by road. Kirgizki is the nearest rural locality.

References 

Rural localities in Dyurtyulinsky District